, also known as the , is a road in Fukushima Prefecture in the Tohoku region, of Honshu, Japan.

Opening in November 1959, the roadway was created to allow visitors to the Tohoku area sightseeing access to the Azuma Mountain Range. The project was part of a larger plan to open up the Bandai-Asahi National Park to tourism.

The roadway passes directly next to the crater of Mt. Azuma, so visitors who so desire can park their cars in the nearby visitor center and take the short hike up to the crater's rim.

For successfully displaying the sheer scale of the country's Azuma Mountain Range to the visitors of the road, the Bandai-Azuma Roadway was selected by the Japanese Ministry of Construction as one of the top 100 roads in Japan.

Due to heavy snowfall in the winter, every year the road is closed from mid-November until early April. Formerly a toll road, it was permanently made free in July 2013.

References

Tourist attractions in Fukushima Prefecture
Roads in Fukushima Prefecture
Former toll roads in Japan